The Battle of the Gulf of Riga was a World War I naval operation of the German High Seas Fleet against the Russian Baltic Fleet in the Gulf of Riga in the Baltic Sea in August 1915. The operation's objective was to destroy the Russian naval forces in the Gulf in preparation for landing German troops to facilitate the fall of Riga in the later stages of the Central Powers' offensive on the Eastern Front in 1915. The German fleet, however, failed to achieve its objective and was forced to return to its bases; Riga remained in Russian hands until it fell to the German Army on 1 September 1917.

Prelude
In early August 1915, several powerful units of the German High Seas Fleet were transferred to the Baltic to participate in the foray into the Riga Gulf. The intention was to destroy the Russian naval forces in the area, including the pre-dreadnought battleship , and to use the minelayer  to block the entrance to Moon Sound with mines.

Battle

On 8 August, the first attempt to clear the gulf was made; the old pre-dreadnought battleships  and  kept Slava at bay while minesweepers cleared a path through the inner belt of mines. During this period, the rest of the German fleet remained in the Baltic and provided protection against other units of the Russian fleet. However, the approach of nightfall meant that Deutschland would be unable to mine the entrance to the Suur Strait in time, and so the operation was broken off.

Several Russian destroyers were anchored off Sõrve, and one was slightly damaged during the bombardment. The battlecruiser Von der Tann and the light cruiser  were sent to shell the island of Utö.

On 16 August, a second attempt was made to enter the gulf. On the first day of the assault, the German minesweeper T46 was sunk, as was the destroyer . On 17 August, Nassau and Posen engaged in an artillery duel with Slava, resulting in three hits on the Russian ship that prompted her withdrawal. After three days, the Russian minefields had been cleared, and the flotilla entered the gulf on 19 August, but reports of Allied submarines in the area prompted a German withdrawal from the gulf the following day.

Throughout the operation, the German battlecruisers remained in the Baltic and provided cover for the assault into the Gulf of Riga. Without time to manoeuver, the ship was struck in the bow torpedo room. The explosion damaged several torpedoes in the ship, but they did not detonate themselves. The ship was repaired at Blohm & Voss in Hamburg, between 23 August and 20 September.

Four large, flat-bottomed barges loaded with German troops attempted to land at Pernau on 20 August, but were repelled by small Russian warships. The Russian gunboat Sivuch was destroyed in an engagement with the German light cruiser  and eight destroyers, while the damaged minelaying cruiser Albatross ran ashore on the island of Gotland in neutral Sweden before the Russian cruiser Rurik forced the remaining German units to retreat.

Order of battle

Russia
 Battleship: 
 Cruiser: 
 Minelayer: 
 Flotilla of 16 destroyers

Germany
 Minelayer: 
 Flotilla of 56 destroyers

Notes

References

External links
 Account of Russian WWI naval operations in the Baltic Sea 

Conflicts in 1915
Baltic Sea operations of World War I
Gulf of Riga
Baltic Fleet
Naval battles of World War I involving the United Kingdom
Naval battles of World War I involving Russia
Naval battles of World War I involving Germany
1915 in the Russian Empire
August 1915 events